Dmitri Shostakovich’s Symphony No. 13 in B-flat minor, Op. 113 is an hour-long work for bass soloist, men's chorus, and large orchestra in five movements, each a setting of a Yevgeny Yevtushenko poem that describes aspects of Soviet history and life. The work has been variously described as a choral symphony, song cycle, and cantata. Although the symphony is commonly referred to by the nickname Babi Yar, no such subtitle is designated in Shostakovich’s manuscript score.

The symphony was completed on July 20, 1962, and first performed in Moscow on December 18 of that year. Kirill Kondrashin conducted the premiere after Yevgeny Mravinsky declined the assignment. Vitaly Gromadsky sang the solo part alongside the combined choruses of the RSFSR State Academy and Gnessin Institute and the Moscow Philharmonic.

Movements 

The symphony consists of five movements.

 In this movement, Shostakovich and Yevtushenko transform the 1941 massacre by Nazis of Jews at Babi Yar, near Kiev, into a denunciation of anti-Semitism in all its forms. (Although the Soviet government did not erect a monument at Babi Yar, it still became a place of pilgrimage for Soviet Jews.) Shostakovich sets the poem as a series of theatrical episodes — the Dreyfus affair, the Białystok pogrom and the story of Anne Frank — extended interludes in the main theme of the poem, lending the movement the dramatic structure and theatrical imagery of opera while resorting to graphic illustration and vivid word painting. For instance, the mocking of the imprisoned Dreyfus by poking umbrellas at him through the prison bars may be in an accentuated pair of eighth notes in the brass, with the build-up of menace in the Anne Frank episode, culminating in the musical image of the breaking down of the door to the Franks' hiding place, which underlines the hunting down of that family. The Russian people are not the anti-Semites, they are "internationals", and the music is briefly hymn-like before dissolving into the cacophony of those who falsely claim to be working for the people. 

 Shostakovich quotes from the third of his Six Romances on Verses by British Poets, Op. 62 (Robert Burns' "Macpherson Before His Execution") to colour Yevtushenko's imagery of the spirit of mockery, endlessly murdered and endlessly resurrected, denouncing the vain attempts of tyrants to shackle wit. The movement is a Mahlerian gesture of mocking burlesque, not simply light or humorous but witty, satirical and parodistic. The irrepressible energy of the music illustrates that, just as with courage and folly, humor, even in the form of "laughing in the face of the gallows" is both irrepressible and eternal (a concept, incidentally, also present in the Burns poem). He also quotes a melody of the Sonata for Two Pianos and Percussion by Bartók ironically, as response for the criticism toward his Symphony no. 7.

 This movement is about the hardship of Soviet women queueing in a shop. It is also a tribute to patient endurance. This arouses Shostakovich's compassion no less than racial prejudice and gratuitous violence. Written in the form of a lament, the chorus departs from its unison line in the music's two concluding harmonized chords for the only time in the entire symphony, ending on a plagal cadence functioning much the same as a liturgical amen.

 This movement touches on the subject of suppression in the Soviet Union and is the most elaborate musically of the symphony's five movements, using a variety of musical ideas to stress its message, from an angry march to alternating soft and violent episodes. Notable here are the orchestral effects — the tuba, for instance, hearkening back to the "midnight arrest" section of the first movement of the Fourth Symphony — containing some of the composer's most adventurous instrumental touches since his Modernist period. It also foresees some of Shostakovich's later practices, such as an 11-note tone row played by the tuba as an opening motif.

Harmonic ambiguity instills a deep sense of unease as the chorus intones the first lines of the poem: "Fears are dying-out in Russia." ("Умирают в России страхи.") Shostakovich breaks this mood only in response to Yevtushenko's agitprop lines, "We weren't afraid/of construction work in blizzards/or of going into battle under shell-fire," ("Не боялись мы строить в метели, / уходить под снарядами в бой,) parodying the Soviet marching song Smelo tovarishchi v nogu ("Bravely, comrades, march to step").

 While this movement opens with a pastoral duet by flutes over a B pedal bass, giving the musical effect of sunshine after a storm, it is an ironic attack on bureaucrats, touching on cynical self-interest and robotic unanimity while also a tribute to genuine creativity. It follows in the vein of other satirical finales, especially the Eighth Symphony and the Fourth and Sixth String Quartets. The soloist comes onto equal terms with the chorus, with sarcastic commentary provided by the bassoon and other wind instruments, as well as rude squeaking from the trumpets. It also relies more than the other movements on purely orchestral passages as links between vocal statements.

Instrumentation
The symphony calls for a bass soloist, bass chorus, and an orchestra with the following instrumentation.

Woodwinds
 
 
 
 

Brass

 4 horns
 3 trumpets
 3 trombones
 1 tuba

Percussion

 timpani

 triangle
 castanets
 whip
 woodblocks
 tambourine
 snare drum
 bass drum
 cymbals
 bells
 tam-tam

Keyboards

 glockenspiel
 xylophone
 celesta
 piano

Strings
 2 harps (preferably doubled)

 violin I's
 violin II's
 violas
 cellos
 double basses

Overview

Background
Shostakovich reportedly told fellow composer Edison Denisov that he had always loathed anti-Semitism. He is also reported to have told musicologist Solomon Volkov, regarding the Babi Yar massacre and the state of Jews in the Soviet Union,

Yevtushenko's poem "Babi Yar" appeared in the Literaturnaya Gazeta in September 1961 and, along with the publication of Alexander Solzhenitsyn's novel One Day in the Life of Ivan Denisovich in Novy Mir, happened during a surge of anti-Stalinist literature during the premiership of Nikita Khrushchev. Publishers began receiving more anti-Stalinist novels, short stories and memoirs. This fad soon faded.

Composition

The symphony was originally intended as a single-movement "vocal-symphonic poem." By the end of May, Shostakovich had found three additional poems by Yevtushenko, which caused him to expand the work into a multi-movement choral symphony by complementing Babi Yar's theme of Jewish suffering with Yevtushenko's verses about other Soviet abuses. Yevtushenko wrote the text for the 4th movement, "Fears," at the composer's request. The composer completed these four additional movements within six weeks, putting the final touches on the symphony on July 20, 1962, during a hospital stay. Discharged that day, he took the night train to Kiev to show the score to bass Boris Gmiyirya, an artist he especially admired and wanted to sing the solo part in the work. From there he went to Leningrad to give the score to conductor Yevgeny Mravinsky.

Yevtushenko remembered, on hearing the composer play and sing the complete symphony for him,

Yevtushenko added, about the composer's setting of Babi Yar that "if I were to able to write music I would have written it exactly the way Shostakovich did.... His music made the poem greater, more meaningful and powerful. In a word, it became a much better poem."

Growing controversy
By the time Shostakovich had completed the first movement on 27 March 1962, Yevtushenko was already being subjected to a campaign of criticism, as he was now considered a political liability. Khrushchev's agents engendered a campaign to discredit him, accusing the poet of placing the suffering of the Jewish people above that of the Russians. The intelligentsia called him a "boudoir poet" — in other words, a moralist. Shostakovich defended the poet in a letter dated 26 October 1965, to his pupil Boris Tishchenko:

For the Party, performing critical texts at a public concert with symphonic backing had a potentially much greater impact than simply reading the same texts at home privately. It should be no surprise, then, that Khrushchev criticized it before the premiere, and threatened to stop its performance, Shostakovich reportedly claimed in Testimony,

By mid-August 1962, singer Boris Gmyrya had withdrawn from the premiere under pressure from the local Party Committee; writing the composer, he claimed that, in view of the dubious text, he declined to perform the work. Conductor Yevgeny Mravinsky soon followed suit, though he excused himself for other than political reasons. Shostakovich then asked Kirill Kondrashin to conduct the work. Two singers were engaged, Victor Nechipailo to sing the premiere, and Vitaly Gromadsky in case a substitute were needed. Nechipailo was forced to drop out at the last minute (to cover at the Bolshoi Theatre for a singer who had been ordered to "get sick" in a performance of Verdi's Don Carlo, according to Vishnevskaya's autobiography "Galina:  A Russian Story", page 278). Kondrashin was also asked to withdraw but refused. He was then put under pressure to drop the first movement.

Premiere

Official interference continued throughout the day of the concert. Cameras originally slated to televise the piece were noisily dismantled. The entire choir threatened to walk out; a desperate speech by Yevtushenko was all that kept them from doing so. The premiere finally went ahead on December 18, 1962 with the government box empty but the theatre otherwise packed. The symphony played to a tremendous ovation. Kondrashin remembered, "At the end of the first movement the audience started to applaud and shout hysterically. The atmosphere was tense enough as it was, and I waved at them to calm down. We started playing the second movement at once, so as not to put Shostakovich into an awkward position." Sculptor Ernst Neizvestny, who was present, said, "It was major! There was a sense of something incredible happening. The interesting part was that when the symphony ended, there was no applause at first, just an unusually long pause—so long that I even thought that it might be some sort of conspiracy. But then the audience burst into wild applause with shouts of 'Bravo!'"

Changed lines 
Kondrashin gave two performances of the Thirteenth Symphony; a third was scheduled for 15 January 1963. However, at the beginning of 1963 Yevtushenko reportedly published a second, now politically correct version of Babi Yar twice the length of the original. The length of the new version can be explained not only by changes in content but also by a noticeable difference in writing style. It might be possible that Yevtushenko intentionally changed his style of narrative to make it clear that the modified version of the text is not something he initially intended. While Shostakovich biographer Laurel Fay maintains that such a volume has yet to surface, the fact remains that Yevtushenko wrote new lines for the eight most offensive ones questioned by the authorities.

The rest of the poem is as strongly aimed at the Soviet political authorities as those lines that were changed so the reasons for these changes were more precise. Not wanting to set the new version to music, yet knowing the original version faced little chance of performance, the composer agreed to the performance of the new version yet did not add those lines to the manuscript of the symphony.

Original Version
Мне кажется сейчас – я иудей.
Вот я бреду по древнему Египту.
А вот я, на кресте распятый, гибну,
и до сих пор на мне – следы гвоздей.
...
И сам я, как сплошной беззвучный крик,
над тысячами тысяч погребённых.
Я – каждый здесь расстрелянный старик.
Я – каждый здесь расстрелянный ребёнок.

Original Version
I feel myself a Jew.
Here I tread across old Egypt.
Here I die, nailed to the cross.
And even now I bear the scars of it.
...
I become a gigantic, soundless scream
Above the thousands buried here.
I am every old man shot dead here.
I am every child shot dead here.

Censored Version
Here I stand at the fountainhead
That gives me faith in brotherhood.
Here Russians lie, and Ukrainians
Together with Jews in the same ground.
...
I think of Russia's heroic dead
In blocking the way to Fascism.
To the smallest dew-drop, she is close to me
In her being and her fate.

Even with these changed lines, the symphony enjoyed relatively few performances — two with the revised text in Moscow in February 1963, one performance in Minsk (with the original text) shortly afterward, as well as Gorky, Leningrad and Novosibirsk. After these performances, the work was effectively banned in the Soviet bloc, the work's premiere in East Berlin occurring only because the local censor had forgotten to clear the performance with Moscow beforehand. Meanwhile, a copy of the score with the original text was smuggled to the West, where it was premiered and recorded in January 1970 by the Philadelphia Orchestra under Eugene Ormandy.

Second to the "Babi Yar" movement, "Fears" was the most viciously attacked of the movements by the bureaucrats. To keep the symphony in performance, seven lines of the poem were altered, replacing references to imprisonment without trial, to neglect of the poor and to the fear experienced by artists.

Choral symphony or symphonic cantata?
Scored for bass soloist, male chorus, and orchestra, the symphony could be argued to be a symphonic cantata or orchestral song cycle rather than a choral symphony. The music, while having a life and logic of its own, remains closely welded to the texts. The chorus, used consistently in unison, often creates the impression of a choral recitation, while the solo baritone's passages create a similar impression of "speech-song." However, Shostakovich provides a solid symphonic framework for the work - a strongly dramatic opening movement, a scherzo, two slow movements and a finale; fully justifying it as a symphony.

Influence of Mussorgsky
Shostakovich's orchestration of Modest Mussorgsky's Boris Godunov, Khovanshchina and Songs and Dances of Death had an important bearing on the Thirteenth Symphony, as well as on Shostakovich's late work. Shostakovich wrote the greater part of his vocal music after his immersion in Mussorgsky's work, and his method of writing for the voice in small intervals, with much tonal repetition and attention to natural declamation, can be said to have been taken directly from Mussorgsky. Shostakovich is reported to have affirmed the older composer's influence, stating that "[w]orking with Mussorgsky clarifies something important for me in my own work... Something from Khovanshchina was transferred to the Thirteenth Symphony."

Recordings
 Vitali Gromadsky, bass; Men of the Republican State and Gnessin Institute Choirs and Moscow Philharmonic Orchestra conducted by Kirill Kondrashin, recorded live during 2nd performance on December 20, 1962 (with original text), released 1993 by Russian Disc. Reissued 2014 by Praga Digital.
Vitaly Gromadsky, bass; Moscow Philharmonic and Male Chorus; Kiril Kondrashin; recording of Sep 1965 (revised text version); Everest Records LP released Nov 1967; remastered to CD by Essential Classics 2011 Historic Recording reached 9 in Billboard USA Classical Chart. The liner notes of the LP state that the tapes were "smuggled" out of the Soviet Union.
Artur Eisen, bass; Men of the Republican State Choir conducted by Alexander Yurlov and Moscow Philharmonic Orchestra conducted by Kirill Kondrashin on Melodiya, recorded in 1965 or 1971 (revised text version) and released 1972.
Tom Krause (bass-baritone), Philadelphia Mendelssohn Club Male Chorus, Philadelphia Orchestra conducted by Eugene Ormandy. RCA SB6830, recorded January 1970.
Dimiter Petkov, bass; London Symphony Chorus, London Symphony Orchestra conducted by Andre Previn. EMI Classics, recorded in 1980.
Marius Rintzler, bass; Men of the Choir of the Royal Concertgebouw Orchestra and Royal Concertgebouw Orchestra conducted by Bernard Haitink on Decca Records, recorded 1984 (available on Spotify)
Nikita Storojev, bass; Men of the CBSO Chorus, City of Birmingham Choir, University of Warwick Chorus, City of Birmingham Symphony Orchestra conducted by Okko Kamu. Chandos 8540 (LP ABRD 1248), recorded January 1987.
 Nicola Ghiuselev, bass; Men of the Choral Arts Society of Washington and National Symphony Orchestra conducted by Mstislav Rostropovich on Teldec, recorded 1988
Peter Mikuláš (bass), Slovak Philharmonic Chorus, Czecho-Slovak Radio Symphony Orchestra conducted by Ladislav Slovák. Naxos: 8.550630, recorded 1990
 Sergei Leiferkus, baritone; Yevgeny Yevtushenko, reciter; Men of the New York Choral Arts and New York Philharmonic conducted by Kurt Masur on Teldec (live performance from 1993)
 Eliahu Inbal, Vienna Symphony Orchestra, Robert Holl. Denon (available on Spotify), recorded 1993
 Anatoly Kortscherga, bass, Gothenburg Symphony Orchestra, Neeme Jarvi, conductor, Deutsche Grammophone, recorded 1995
 John Shirley-Quirk, bass, Düsseldorfer Symphoniker, David Shallon, conductor, Musica MundI, recorded 1995
 Sergei Aleksashkin, bass, Chicago Symphony Chorus, Chicago Symphony Orchestra conducted Sir Georg Solti. Decca, recorded in 1995
 Sergei Aleksashkin, bass, Cologne Radio Symphony Orchestra, Rudolf Barshai, Brilliant Classics, recorded 2000
 Sergei Aleksashkin, bass; Chor des Bayerischen Rundfunks and Symphonieorchester des Bayerischen Rundfunks conducted by Mariss Jansons on EMI Classics, recorded in 2005 (available on Spotify)
 Jan-Hendrik Rootering, bass; Netherlands Radio Choir and Philharmonic Orchestra conducted by Mark Wigglesworth, BIS Records (2006)
 Alexander Vinogradov (bass), Huddersfield Choral Society, Royal Liverpool Philharmonic Choir, Royal Liverpool Philharmonic Orchestra conducted by Vasily Petrenko. Naxos: 8.573218, recorded 2013
 Alexey Tikhomirov, bass; Men of the Chicago Symphony Chorus, Chicago Symphony Orchestra conducted by Riccardo Muti. CSO Resound, recorded in 2018 (live performance) (available on Spotify)
 Michael Sanderling, Dresdner Philharmonic, 2019 (available on Spotify)
 Sergei Koptchak, bass; Nikikai Chorus Group and NHK Symphony Orchestra conducted by Vladimir Ashkenazy on Decca Records (live performance)
 Anatoli Safiulin, bass; Male Chorus of the Yurlov State Academic Russian Chorus and USSR Ministry of Culture Symphony Orchestra - State Symphony Capella of Russia conducted by Gennady Rozhdestvensky.
 Oleg Tsibulko, bass; Popov Academy of Choral Arts Choir, Kozhevnikov Choir - Russian National Orchestra conducted by Kiril Karabits. Pentatone PTC 5186 618, recorded 2017

 Saulius Sondeckis conducting the Lithuanian Chamber Orchestra with the Estonian National Choir and the St. Petersburg Camerata released on Sony in 1995. Sergei Baikov, bass.

 Rudolf Barshai conducting the West German Radio Symphony, 2002, Regis CD.

 Christopher James Lees conducted the Michigan State University Choirs and Orchestra on April 27, 2019 at Cobb Great Hall, Wharton Center in East Lansing, Michigan. On April 28, 2019, they performed the symphony at Orchestra Hall in Detroit. Mark Rucker was the baritone soloist.
 Valery Gergiev conducted the Chorus and Orchestra of The Mariinsky Theatre, Kirov Opera, at the 2006 BBC Proms at Royal Albert Hall in London, England, on August 19, 2006. The soloist was bass Mikhail Petrenko. The 2006 Proms marked the centenary of Shostakovich's birth on September 25, 1906.
 Hobart Earle conducted a live concert performance by the Odessa Philharmonic Orchestra at Philharmonic Hall in Odessa, Ukraine, in May, 2008.
 Gidon Saks, bass; Royal Liverpool Philharmonic Orchestra conducted by Gerard Schwarz released in 2006 on Avie.
 Yuri Temirkanov conducted a performance by the St. Petersburg Philharmonic Orchestra with Serge Aleksashkin, bass, released on RCA Red Seal in 2006.

See also
In Memoriam to the Martyrs of Babi Yar

Notes
1.This nickname neither appears on the title page of the symphony's manuscript score nor originates from the composer.

References

Sources
 Blokker, Roy, with Robert Dearling, The Music of Dmitri Shostakovich: The Symphonies (London: The Tantivy Press, 1979). .
 Fay, Laurel, Shostakovich: A Life (Oxford: 2000). .
 Figes, Orlando, Natasha's Dance: A Cultural History of Russia (New York: Picador, 2002). .
 Layton, Robert, ed. Robert Simpson, The Symphony: Volume 2, Mahler to the Present Day (New York: Drake Publishing Inc., 1972). .
 MacDonald, Ian, The New Shostakovich (Boston: 1990).  (reprinted & updated in 2006).
 Maes, Francis, tr. Arnold J. Pomerans and Erica Pomerans, A History of Russian Music: From Kamarinskaya to Babi Yar (Berkeley, Los Angeles and London: University of California Press, 2002). .
 Schwarz, Boris, ed. Stanley Sadie, The New Grove Dictionary of Music and Musicians (London: Macmillan, 1980), 20 vols. .
 ed. Volkov, Solomon, trans. Antonina W. Bouis, Testimony: The Memoirs of Dmitri Shostakovich (New York: Harper & Row, 1979). .
 Volkov, Solomon,  tr. Antonina W. Bouis, Shostakovich and Stalin: The Extraordinary Relationship Between the Great Composer and the Brutal Dictator (New York: Alfred A. Knopf, 2004). .
 Wilson, Elizabeth, Shostakovich: A Life Remembered, Second Edition (Princeton, New Jersey: Princeton University Press, 1994, 2006). .

External links 
 Texts of the poems in Russian and English translation (original text).

Shostakovich 13
Symphonies by Dmitri Shostakovich
1962 in the Soviet Union
1962 compositions
Compositions in B-flat minor
Classical music about the Holocaust
Censorship in Russia
Babi Yar